Social media use in politics refers to the use of online social media platforms in political processes and activities. Political processes and activities include  all activities that pertain to the governance of a country or area. This includes political organization, global politics, political corruption, political parties, and political values.

The internet has created channels of communication that play a key role in circulating news, and social media has the power to change not just the message, but the dynamics of political corruption, values, and the dynamics of conflict in politics. Through the use of social media in election processes, global conflict, and extreme politics, diplomacy around the world has become less private and susceptive to the public perception.

Background

Participatory role 
Social media have been championed as allowing anyone with an Internet connection to become a content creator and empowering their users. The idea of "new media populism" encompasses how citizens can include disenfranchised citizens, and allow the public to have an engaged and active role in political discourse.  New media, including social media platforms such as Facebook and Twitter, can enhance people's access to political information.

Social media platforms and the internet have facilitated the dissemination of political information that counters mainstream media tactics that are often centralized and top-down, and include high barriers to entry. Writer Howard Rheingold characterized the community created on social networking sites:"The political significance of computer mediated communication lies in its capacity to challenge the existing political hierarchy's monopoly on powerful communications media, and perhaps thus revitalize citizen-based democracy."Scholar Derrick de Kerckhove described the new technology in media: "In a networked society, the real powershift is from the producer to the consumer, and there is a redistribution of controls and power. On the Web, Karl Marx's dream has been realized: the tools and the means of production are in the hands of the workers."The role of social media in democratizing media participation, which proponents herald as ushering in a new era of participatory democracy, with all users able to contribute news and comments, may fall short of the ideals. International survey data suggest online media audience members are largely passive consumers, while content creation is dominated by a small number of social users who post comments and write new content. Others argue that the effect of social media will vary from one country to another, with domestic political structures playing a greater role than social media in determining how citizens express opinions about stories of current affairs involving the state.

Most people see social media platforms as censoring objectionable political views.

In June 2020, users of the Social Media platform TikTok organised a movement to prank a Trump Rally in Tulsa, Oklahoma by buying tickets and not attending so that the rally appeared empty.

As a news source 
See also Social media and political communication in the United States.

Social media platforms are increasingly used for political news and information by adults in the United States, especially when it comes to election time. A study by Pew Research conducted in November 2019, found that one-in-five US adults get their political news primarily through social media. 18% of adults use social media to get their political and election news. In small research conducted by McKeever et al in 2022, they found that 269 out of the 510 United States participants had noted that they got most of their information about gun violence from social media sources.

The Pew Research Center further found that out of these United States Adults relying on social media for this information, 48% of them are from ages 18–29.

In addition, Reddit, Twitter, Facebook, lead the social media platforms in which the majority of the users use the platforms to acquire news information.  Two thirds of Facebook users (66%) acces news on the platform; 59% of Twitter users access news on the platform, and 70% of Reddit users access news on the platform.

According to the Reuters Institute Digital News Report in 2013, the percentage of online news users who blog about news issues ranges from 1–5%. Greater percentages use social media to comment on news, with participation ranging from 8% in Germany to 38% in Brazil. But online news users are most likely to just talk about online news with friends offline or use social media to share stories without creating content.

The rapid propagation of information on social media, spread by word of mouth, can impact the perception of political figures quickly with information that may or may not be true. When political information is propagated in this manner on purpose, the spread of information on social media for political means can benefit campaigns. On the other hand, the word-of-mouth propagation of negative information concerning a political figure can be damaging. For example, the use of the social media platform Twitter by United States congressman Anthony Weiner to send inappropriate messages played a role in his resignation.

Attention economy 
Social media, especially news that is spread through social media sites, plays into the idea of the attention economy. In which content that attracts more attention will be seen, shared, and disseminated far more than news content that does not gather as much traction from the public.  Tim Wu from Columbia Law School coins the attention economy as "the resale of human attention."

A communication platform such as social media is persuasive, and often works to change or influence opinions when it comes to political views because of the abundance of ideas, thoughts, and opinions circulating through the social media platform. It is found that news use leads to political persuasion, therefore the more that people use social media platforms for news sources, the more their political opinions will be affected. Despite that, people are expressing less trust in their government and others due to media use- therefore social media directly affects trust in media use. It is proven that while reading newspapers there is an increase in social trust where on the contrary watching the news on television weakened trust in others and news sources. Social media, or more specifically news media- plays an important role in democratic societies because they allow for participation among citizens.Therefore, when it comes to healthy democratic networks, it is crucial that that news remains true so it doesn't affect citizens' levels of trust. A certain amount of trust is necessary for a healthy and well functioning democratic system.

Younger generations are becoming more involved in politics due to the increase of political news posted on various types of social media. Due to the heavier use of social media among younger generations, they are exposed to politics more frequently, and in a way that is integrated into their online social lives. While informing younger generations of political news is important, there are many biases within the realms of social media. In May 2016, former Facebook Trending News curator Benjamin Fearnow revealed his job was to "massage the algorithm," but dismissed any "intentional, outright bias" by either human or automated efforts within the company. Fearnow was fired by Facebook after being caught leaking several internal company debates about Black Lives Matter and presidential candidate Donald Trump.

As a public utility 

A key debate centers on whether or not social media is a public good based on the premises of non-rival and non-excludable consumption. Social media can be considered an impure public good as it can be excludable given the rights of platforms such as Facebook and Twitter to remove content, disable accounts, and filter information based on algorithms and community standards.

Arguments for platforms such as Google in being treated as a public utility and public service provider include statements from Benjamin Barber in The Nation"For new media to be potential equalizers, they must be treated as public utilities, recognizing that spectrum abundance (the excuse for privatization) does not prevent monopoly ownership of hardware and software platforms and hence cannot guarantee equal civic, educational, and cultural access to citizens."Similarly, Zeynep Tufekci argues online services are natural monopolies that underwrite the "corporatization of social commons" and the "privatization of our publics."

One argument that displays the nature of social media as an impure public good is the fact that the control over content remains in the hands of a few large media networks, Google and Facebook, for example. Google and Facebook have the power to shape the environment under personal and commercial goals that promotes profitability, as opposed to promoting citizen voice and public deliberation.

.

.

.

.

Government regulation 
Proponents and aims for regulation of social media are growing due to economic concerns of monopolies of the platforms, to issues of privacy, censorship, network neutrality and information storage. The discussion of regulation is complicated due to the issue how Facebook, and Google are increasingly becoming a service, information pipeline, and content provider, and thus centers on how the government would regulate both the platform as a service and information provider. Thus, other proponents advocate for "algorithmic neutrality", or the aim for search engines on social media platforms to rank data without human intervention.

Opponents of regulation of social media platforms argue that platforms such as Facebook and Twitter do not resemble traditional public utilities, and regulation would harm consumer welfare as public utility regulation can hinder innovation and competition.  Second, as the First Amendment values are criticized on social media platforms, the media providers should retain the power to how the platform is configured.

Effect on democracy 
Social media has been criticized as being detrimental to democracy. According to Ronald Deibert, "The world of social media is more conducive to extreme, emotionally charged, and divisive types of content than it is to calm, principled considerations of competing or complex narratives". On the contrary, Ethan Zuckerman says that social media presents the opportunity to inform more people, amplify voices, and allow for an array of diverse voices to speak. Mari K. Eder points to failures of the Fourth Estate that have allowed outrage to be disguised as news, contributing to citizen apathy when confronting falsehoods and further distrust in democratic institutions.
However, the growth of social media has allowed a growth of political participation to a whole new audience within society. This can be seen as a "kick starter of a deeper transformation of democratic practices and opportunities"  suggesting that digital media can have huge influences and changes within politics but the question still remains if young people will remain politically active within the near future.

Politicians and social media 
Social media has allowed politicians to subvert typical media outlets by engaging with the general public directly. Donald Trump utilised this when he lost the 2020 presidential election by claiming the election to be fraudulent and therefore creating the need for a re-election. The consequences of Trump's online actions were displayed when, on January 6, the U.S. Capitol was attacked by supporters of the former president.

Being a popular presence on social media also boosts a politician's likelihood of coming to power take Boris Johnson in the 2019 bid to replace Theresa May as Prime Minister, Johnson had more than half a million page 'liking' his page (substantially more than the other candidates) which meant that when he released his launch video it gained more than 130,000 views which could have been a prominent factor in him eventually winning power.

A study conducted by Sounman Hong found that in the case of politicians utilising social media and whether its use would increase on their individual weighing up on the consequences and if they would be largely positive or negative found that in the case of backbenchers, 'underdogs' and opposition it was likely to increase in order to gain recognition and support from the public eye where they otherwise might go unnoticed.

Democratization

The Arab Spring 

During the peak of the Egyptian Revolution of 2011, the Internet and social media played a huge role in facilitating information. At that time, Hosni Mubarak was the president of Egypt and head the regime for almost 30 years. Mubarak was so threatened by the immense power that the Internet and social media gave the people that the government successfully shut down the Internet, using the Ramses Exchange, for a period of time in February 2011.

Egyptians used Facebook, Twitter, and YouTube as a means to communicate and organize demonstrations and rallies to overthrow President Hosni Mubarak. Statistics show that during this time the rate of Tweets from Egypt increased from 2,300 to 230,000 per day and the top 23 protest videos had approximately 5.5 million views. The Supreme Council of the Armed Forces, the military coup that deposed President Mubarak, set up a Facebook page quickly after gaining power. Through this, the new regime sought control over the dissemination of information, with the Facebook page being the exclusive outlet for information

Use in autocracies 
Social Media in autocracies enables both freedom for protestors and control for ruling regimes. On the one hand, social media represents a freedom of information that could previously be gatekept by ruling governments through their control over traditional media. This makes it harder for dictators to hide atrocities from the people, as anyone with a camera phone is capable of exposing acts of terror with ease. Gruesome images of bodies which would have previously been kept out of newspapers can now be plastered all over social media, inspiring people to act.

Social media platforms can also give governments an unprecedented amount of information over the population. This can be used to track certain individuals, such as political opponents, and censor dissent.

Disinformation in relation to US election

Though fake news can generate some utility for consumers, in terms of confirming far-right beliefs and spreading propaganda in favor of a presidential candidate, it also imposes private and social costs. For example, one social cost to consumer is the spread of disinformation which can make it harder for consumers to seek out the truth and, in the case of the 2016 Election, for consumers to choose an electoral candidate. Summarized by a Congressional Research Service Study in 2017,"Cyber tools were also used [by Russia] to create psychological effects in the American population. The likely collateral effects of these activities include compromising the fidelity of information, sowing discord and doubt in the American public about the validity of intelligence community reports, and prompting questions about the democratic process itself."The marginal social cost of fake news is exponential, as the first article is shared it can affect a small number of people, but as the article is circulated more throughout Facebook, the negative externality multiplies. As a result, the quantity demanded of news can shift up around election season as consumers seek to find correct news, however the quantity demanded can also shift down as people have a lower trust in mainstream media. In the American public, a Gallup poll in 2016 found "Americans' trust in the mass media 'to report the news fully, accurately and fairly' was, at 32%, the lowest in the organization's polling history."  In addition, trust in mainstream media is lower in Republican and far-right political viewers at 14%. About 72% of American adults claim that social media firms excessively control and influence the politics today, as per the June 16–22 survey conducted by Pew Research Center. Only 21% believe that the power held by these social media firms over today's politics is of the right amount, while 6% believe it is not enough.

Algorithms can facilitate the rapid spread of disinformation through social media channels. Algorithms use users' past behavior and engagement activity to provide them with tailored content that aligns with their interests and beliefs. Algorithms commonly create echo chambers and sow radicalism and extremist thinking in these online spaces.

Algorithms promote social media posts with high 'engagement,' meaning posts that received a lot of 'likes' or 'comments'/'replies'. For better or for worse, engagement and controversy go hand-in-hand. Controversy attracts attention as it evokes an emotional response, however "Benford's Law" of controversy states that "passion is inversely proportional to the amount of real information available". This means that the less grounded in facts a political tweet is, the more engagement it is likely to receive, therefore the likelihood of spreading disinformation is high. Twitter has become a battleground for political debate. Psychologist, Jordan Peterson, spoke of Twitter's radicalising effect in an interview conducted by GQ. He explained that for any given tweet that appears on one's 'feed,' the tweet shall have been seen by a far greater number of people than is reflected by its likes and comments. Therefore, who are the people who comment on a tweet? The people who comment shall be those who have the strongest views on the matter, the people who want their opinion to be heard. Peterson claims that this creates an environment in which the opinions that the average user sees on twitter do not reflect the views of a random sample of the population. The opinions most commonly seen on twitter tend to be those of people at each extreme end of the political ideology spectrum, hence the 'radicalising effect'.

Advertisement 

Political advertisements—for example, encouraging people to vote for or against a particular candidate, or to take a position on a particular issue—have often been placed on social media. On 22 November 2019, Twitter said it would no longer facilitate political advertising anywhere in the world. Due to the nature of Social media bringing different information to different people based on their interests, advertising methods such as "Microtargeting" and "Black ads" have become prominent on social media and allow advertising to be much more effective for the same price, relative to traditional adverts such as those on cable TV.

Grassroots campaigns 
When it comes to political referendums, individuals often gather on social media at the grassroots level to campaign for change. This is particularly effective where it comes to feminist political issues, as studies have proven that women are more likely to tweet about policy problems and do so in a way that is more aggressive than their male counter-parts. Like-minded individuals can collectively work together to influence social change and utilise social media as a tool for social justice. An example of this is in the referendum to appeal Ireland's eighth amendment. Civil society organisations, such as TogetherForYes, utilised Twitter as a tool to bring abortion law into the public and make the harms of the eighth amendment visible and accessible. The positive outcome of the referendum (in the amendments repeal) can be equated to the efforts of individuals and advocates coming together at the grassroots level to make the vote visible, as social media goes beyond the local level to create a widespread global political impact, making the issue of strict abortion laws a global one, rather than one just confined to Ireland. The strength in a political grassroots campaign on social media is the increased mobilisation of participants. Due to the fact that social media platforms are largely accessible, a political platform can be provided to the voices of those traditionally silenced in the political sphere or in traditional media. As well as bringing awareness to the campaign, social media (including Twitter) also provides a platform of conversation. Specifically when the grassroots campaign is trying to tackle a high ranking secular state such as the Catholic Church in Northern Ireland, it can be difficult to promote the campaign as the church has such influence and authority. And so can be argued that this campaign gained such momentum because of its social media awareness with voters for the movement being active and engaged on social media, with the campaign going from social media to law in less than 2 years.

US election interference 

The 2016 United States Presidential Election was an example in which social media was used by the state actor Russia to influence public opinion. Tactics such as propaganda, trolling, and bots were used to leak fake news stories that included an "FBI agent had been killed after leaking Clinton's emails" and "Pope Francis had endorsed Donald Trump." Studies have found that pro-Trump news was as many as four-time more than pro-Clinton fake news, and a third of the pro-Trump tweets were generated by bots.
Social media has also provided the means for large amounts of data to be collected on social media users – allowing analysis and predictions to be made on what information and advertising the user is most likely to be susceptible to. This was highlighted in 2018 when the Cambridge Analytica – Facebook scandal emerged. Data and predictions from the company were used to influence voters in the 2016 Brexit/Leave campaign and also the 2016 US election Trump Campaign.

This scandal first appeared in the news in 2016 following both the UK's Brexit referendum results and the US' presidential election result but was an on-going operation by Cambridge Analytica with the permission of Facebook using Aleksandr Kogan's app "This is your Digital Life". However, the methods were exposed on 27 September 2016 during a presentation by Alexander Nix named "The Power of Big Data and Psychographics". Nix was the chief executive officer of market-research at Cambridge Analytica. After founding the company in 2013 he was then suspended on 20 March 2018 following the release of a video in which he admitted to working directly with Donald Trump to gather data on the US electorate. In his 2016 presentation, Nix highlights his contribution the 2016 Ted Cruz campaign and how taking the focus away from demographics and geographics for the targeted ads and instead using psychographics in order to target personality traits and get a better understanding of voter demands is a more effective method of gaining votes. In 2016, one of Nix's business associates, Steve Bannon, left the company to take over the campaign of Donald Trump and as a result of the video leak which lost Nix his job it is largely believed he had direct influence too. As well as this, Cambridge Analytica staff were also heavily involved in the Vote-Leave campaign for the 2016 Brexit referendum. As a result of an organisation specialised in targeted ads being involved in two populist campaigns that produced shock results, many point out as a potential threat to democracy.

But this is not the only example of potential election interference using social media. November 1, 2015, Rodrigo Duterte was announced as president of Philippines after being 'the first person to make the full use of the power of social media'. Facebook had made an astonishing rise since the previous election and Duterte saw this as an opportunity to get social media influencers to promote his party and create viral content, further showing the power social media can have over democracy.

On 18 May 2017, Time had reported that the US Congress was investigating CA in connection with Russian interference in the 2016 United States elections. The report alleges that CA may have coordinated the spread of Russian propaganda using its microtargetting capabilities. In 2018, following disclosures that the company had improperly used the personal information of over 50 million Facebook users while working on Trump's presidential campaign, The Times of Israel reported that the company had used what Nix had called "intelligence gathering" from British and Israeli companies as part of their efforts to influence the election results in Trump's favor. 
This was the work of one company and regulation may be able to prevent this in the future, but social media is now a medium that makes this kind of interference possible.

Election results 
In October 2020, Twitter announced its new policy that candidates will be forbidden to claim victory until their election win has been credibly projected by news outlets or officially certified.

Impact on elections 
Social media has a profound effect on elections. Oftentimes, social media compounds with the mass media networks such as cable television. For many individuals, cable television serves as the basis and first contact for where many get their information and sources. Cable television also has commentary that creates partisanship and builds on to people's predispositions to certain parties. Social media takes mass media's messages and oftentimes amplifies and reinforces such messages and perpetuates partisan divides. In an article by the Journal of Communication, they concluded that social media does not have a strong effect on people's views or votes, but social media does not also have a minimal effect on their views. Instead, social media creates a bandwagon effect when a candidate in an election commits an error or a great success, then users on social media will amplify the effect of such failure or success greatly.

The Pew Research Center finds that nearly one fourth of Americans learn something about the candidates through an internet source such as Facebook. Nearly a fifth of America uses social media with two thirds of those Americans being youth ages of 18–29. The youth's presence on social media often inspires rallies and creates movements. For instance, in the 2008 presidential election, a Facebook group of 62,000 members was created that sponsored the election of President Obama and within days universities across the countries held rallies in the thousands. Rallies and movements such as these are often coined the "Facebook Effect". However, social media can often have the opposite effect and take a toll on many users. The Pew Research Center in a poll found that nearly 55 percent of social media users in the US indicate that they are "worn out" by the amount of political posts on social media. With the rise of technology and social media continuing, that number increased by nearly 16 percent since the 2016 presidential election. Nearly 70 percent of individuals say that talking about politics on social media with people on the opposite side is often "stressful and frustrating" compared to 56 percent in 2016. Consequently, the number of people who find these discussions as "interesting and informative" decreased from 35% to 26% since 2016.

In terms of social media's effect on the youth vote, it is quite substantial. In the 2018 elections, nearly 31 percent of the youth voted compared to just 21 percent in 2014. Social media use among the youth continue to grow as around 90 percent of the youth use at least one social media platform. Of the 90 percent, 47 percent received information about the 2018 elections via a social media platform. The messages shared on the social media platform often include messages to register to vote and actually carrying out their vote; this is in contrast to receiving the message from the candidate's campaign itself. Subsequently, of the first time youth voters in the 2018 election, 68 percent relied on social media to get their information about voting. This is in comparison to the traditional methods of being notified to vote of just 23 percent first time voters. Furthermore, just 22 percent of youth who did not hear about an election via social media or traditional means were very likely to vote; however, 54 percent of youth who found out about the election via social media or traditional ways were very likely to vote. However, the youth are becoming distrustful of the content they read on social media as Forbes notes that there has been a decline in public trust due to many political groups and foreign nations creating fake accounts to spread a great amount of misinformation with the aim of dividing the country.

Social media often filters what information individuals see. Since 2008, the number of individuals who get their news via social media has increased to 62 percent. On these social media sites, there are many algorithms run that filter what information individual users see. The algorithms understand a users favorites and dislikes, they then begin to cater their feed to their likes. Consequently, this creates an echo chamber. For instance, black social media users were more likely to see race related news and in 2016 the Trump campaign used Facebook and other platforms to target Hillary Clinton's supporters to drive them out of the election and taking advantage of such algorithms. Whether or not these algorithms have an effect on people's vote and their views is mixed. Iowa State University finds that for older individuals, even though their access to social media is far lower than the youth, their political views were far more likely to change from the 1996–2012 time periods, which indicates that there are a myriad of other factors that impact political views. They further that based upon other literature, Google has a liberal bias in their search results. Consequently, these biased search results can affect an individual's voting preferences by nearly 20 percent. In addition, 23 percent of an individual's Facebook friends are of an opposing political view and nearly 29 percent of the news they receive on the platform is also in opposition of their political ideology, which indicates that the algorithms on these new platforms do not completely create echo chambers.

Washington State University political science professor Travis Ridout explains that in the United Kingdom the popular social media platforms of Twitter, Facebook, Instagram, and YouTube are beginning to play a significant role in campaigns and elections. Contrary to the United States which allows television ads, in the United Kingdom television ads are banned and thus campaigns are now launching huge efforts on social media platforms. Ridout furthers that the social media ads have gotten in many cases offensive and in attack formation at many politicians. Social media is able to provide many individuals with a sense of anonymity that enables them to get away with such aggressive acts. For example, ethnic minority women politicians are often the targets of such attacks. Furthermore, in the United States, many of the youth conservative voices are often reduced. For instance, PragerU, a conservative organization, often has their videos taken down. On a different level, social media can also hamper many political candidates. Media and social media often publish stories about news that are controversial and popular and will ultimately drive more traffic. A key example is President Donald Trump whose controversial statements in 2016 often brought the attention of many individuals and thereby increased his popularity while shunning out other candidates.

In the 2020 Presidential Election, social media was very prevalent and used widely by both campaigns. For Twitter, nearly 87 million users follow President Donald Trump while 11 million users follow Joe Biden. Despite the significant gap between the two, Biden's top tweets have outperformed Donald Trump's top tweets by nearly double. In terms of mentions of each candidate on Twitter, from October 21 to October 23, there were 6.6 million mentions of Trump and Biden and Biden held 72%  of the mentions. During the 2020 Presidential Debates, Biden had nearly two times the mentions as Donald Trump with nearly half of the mentions being negative. For Trump, he also had half of his mentions being negative as well.

In Europe, the influence of social media is less than that of the United States. In 2011, only 34% of MEPs use twitter, while 68% use Facebook. In 2012, the EPP had the highest social media following of 7,418 compared to the other parties. This is in relationship to the 375 million voters in all of Europe. When comparing the impact to US social media following, former President Obama has over 27 million fans while the highest in Europe was former French President Nicolas Sarkozy of over 700,000 fines, a stark difference. The 2008 US presidential election skyrocketed the need for technologies to be used in politics and campaigns, especially social media. Europe is now following their lead and has been increasing their use of social media since.
However, just because European Politicians don't use social media as much as American Politicians doesn't mean that social media platforms such as Facebook and Twitter don't play a large role in European Politics- in particular- Elections. In the run-up to the 2017 German Bundestag Elections, a group of extremists used social media platforms such as Twitter and YouTube in hopes of gaining support for the far-right group Alternative für Deutschland. Despite being limited in numbers, the group were able to publish "patriotic videos" that managed to get on to the Trending tab on YouTube as well as being able to trend the hashtag "#AfD" on Twitter. Though polled to come 5th in the election, Alternative für Deutschland won 13.3% of the vote, making them the third largest party within the Bundestag, making them the first far-right party to enter the building since 1961

In the UK, Cambridge Analytica was allegedly hired as a consultant company for Leave.EU and the UK Independence Party during 2016, as an effort to convince people to support Brexit. These rumours were the result of the leaked internal emails that were sent between Cambridge Analytica firm and the British parliament. These datasets composed of the data obtained from Facebook were said to be work done as an initial job deliverable for them. Although Arron Banks, co-founder of Leave.EU, denied any involvement with the company, he later declared "When we said we'd hired Cambridge Analytica, maybe a better choice of words could have been deployed." The official investigation by the UK Information Commissioner found that Cambridge Analytica was not involved "beyond some initial enquiries" and the regulator did not identify any "significant breaches" of data protection legislation or privacy or marketing regulations "which met the threshold for formal regulatory action"
In early July 2018, the United Kingdom's Information Commissioner's Office announced it intended to fine Facebook £500,000 ($663,000) over the data breach, this being the maximum fine allowed at the time of the breach, saying Facebook "contravened the law by failing to safeguard people's information". In 2014 and 2015, the Facebook platform allowed an app that ended up harvesting 87 million profiles of users around the world that was then used by Cambridge Analytica in the 2016 presidential campaign and in the Brexit referendum. Although Cambridge Analytica were cleared, questions were still raised with how they came to access these Facebook profiles and target voters that would not have necessarily voted in this matter in the first place. Dominic Cummings the prime minister's ex aide had a majority in involving Cambridge Analytica in the Leave.EU campaign, this can be seen in the real accounts of Brexit: The Uncivil War.

In terms of analyzing the role of fake news in social media, there tends to be about three times more fake new articles that were more likely to be pro-Trump over pro-Clinton articles. There were 115 pro-Trump fake news articles while only 41 pro-Clinton fake news articles; pro-Trump articles were shared 30.3 million times while pro-Clinton articles were shared 7.6 million times on Facebook. For each share there is about 20 page visits which means that with around 38 million shares of fake news articles there are 760 million page views to these articles. This means that roughly each US adult visited a fake news site three times. Whether the spread of fake news has an impact on elections is conflicted as more research is required and is difficult to place a quantification on the effects. However, fake news is more likely to influence individuals who are over 65 and are more conservative. These groups tend to believe fake news more than other groups. College students have difficulty in determining if an article shared on social media is fake news. The same study also concluded that conspiratorial beliefs could be predicted by a person's political party affiliation or their ideological beliefs. For example, those that Republican or held a more conservative belief were far more likely to believe in baseless theories such as that of former President Obama being born outside of the United States; and those that voted Democrat or held a more liberal belief would be more likely to believe in conspiracies such as former President Bush having played a role in the 9/11 attacks.

Role in conflict
There are four ways social media plays a significant role in conflict:.

 Social media platforms allow information to be framed in mainstream platforms which limits communication.  
 Social media enables news stories to quickly go viral and later can lead to misinterpretations that can cause conflict. 
 Strategies and the adaption of social media has caused a change in focus amongst leaders from administrative dynamics to new media technology. 
 Technological advancements in communication can increase the power of persuasion leading to corruption, scandals, and violence on social media platforms.

The role of technological communication and social media in the world can lead to political, economic, and social conflict due to its unmonitored system, cheap interface, and accessibility.

Weaponization by state actors 
Social media platforms have been weaponized by state-sponsored cyber groups to attack governments in the United States, the European Union, and the Middle East. Although phishing attacks via email are the most commonly used tactic to breach government networks, phishing attacks on social media rose 500% in 2016. As with email-based phishing attacks, the majority of phishing attacks on social media are financially motivated cyber crimes that install malware. However, cyber groups associated with Russia, Iran, and China have used social media to conduct cyberattacks and undermine democratic processes in the West. During the 2017 French presidential election, for example, Facebook detected and removed fake accounts linked to the Russian cyber group Fancy Bear, who were posing as "friends of friends" of Emmanuel Macron associates to steal information from them. Cyber groups associated with Iran, China, and Russia have used LinkedIn to steal trade secrets, gain access to critical infrastructure, or recruit spies. These social engineering attacks can be multi-platform, with threat actors initiating contact on one platform but continuing communication on more private channel. The Iranian-backed cyber group COBALT GYPSY created a fake persona across multiple social media platforms and initiated contact on LinkedIn before moving to Facebook and email.

In December 2019, a chat and video calling application developed by the United Arab Emirates, called ToTok was identified as a spying tool by the US intelligence. Suspicion over the Emirati app emerged because it  banned the use of VoIP on applications like WhatsApp, FaceTime and Skype.

Lately, we have social media platforms like TikTok and Snapchat that are very vital when it comes to sharing pictorial and video content. This is one of the most effective ways of digital marketing through social media.

See also 
 After Truth: Disinformation and the Cost of Fake News
 Influence of mass media#Political importance of mass media
 Mass media and American politics
 Political communication#Role of social media
 Politico-media complex
 Propaganda through media
 Russian interference in the 2016 United States elections
 Timeline of Russian interference in the 2016 United States elections / Timeline of Russian interference in the 2016 United States elections (July 2016–election day)
 Social media in the 2016 United States presidential election

References

Social media
Political communication